Rangiya Assembly constituency is one of the 126 assembly constituencies of Assam Legislative Assembly. Rangiya forms part of the Mangaldoi Lok Sabha constituency

Members of Legislative Assembly 
 1951: Siddhinath Sarma, Indian National Congress
 1957: Constituency abolished
 1962: Siddhinath Sarma, Indian National Congress
 1967: K. M. Sarma, Communist Party of India
 1972: Manabendranath Sarma, Indian National Congress
 1978: Purna Boro, Communist Party of India (Marxist)
 1983: Purna Boro, Communist Party of India (Marxist)
 1985: Thaneswar Boro, Independent
 1991: Thaneswar Boro, Asom Gana Parishad
 1996: Thaneswar Boro, Asom Gana Parishad
 2001: Bhubaneswar Kalita, Indian National Congress
 2006: Ananta Deka, Communist Party of India (Marxist)
 2011: Ghanashyam Kalita, Indian National Congress
 2016: Bhabesh Kalita, Bharatiya Janata Party
 2021: Bhabesh Kalita,Bharatiya Janata Party

Election results

2021 result

2016 result

External links

References

Assembly constituencies of Assam